Artificial meat(s) may refer to:

Cultured meat, meat grown in cell cultures instead of inside animals
Factory farming related meats, foodstuffs created in highly managed conditions
Meat analogue, imitation meat products such as tofu, tempeh, textured vegetable protein (TVP),  wheat gluten, pea protein, or mycoprotein

See also
Artificiality
Meat (disambiguation)